The infrared Ca II triplet, commonly known as the calcium triplet, is a triplet of three ionised calcium spectral lines at the wavelengths of 8498 Å, 8542 Å and 8662 Å (measured in air). The triplet has a strong emission, and is most prominently observed in the absorption of spectral type G, K and M stars.

See also
Fraunhofer lines
Infrared spectroscopy

References

Astronomical spectroscopy